Zidisha allows people to lend small amounts of money directly to entrepreneurs in developing countries. It is the first peer-to-peer microlending service to link borrowers and lenders across international borders without a local microfinance institution intermediary.  The organization is named after the Swahili word , which means "grow" or "expand".

The Zidisha website facilitates microlending transactions between individual web users worldwide and computer-literate, low-income entrepreneurs in developing countries. Users can fund loans, which borrowers use to develop businesses that improve their families' incomes. Borrowers can share business updates and communicate with lenders as they repay loans.

History 

Zidisha was founded in October 2009 by Julia Kurnia.

After visiting Niger as Portfolio Analyst for the US African Development Foundation, Kurnia became disillusioned with foreign aid.  In 2006, she co-founded the Senegal Ecovillage Microfinance (SEM) Fund with John Fay and Nan Guslander. To keep financing and salary costs low, SEM raised money from the online microlending portal Kiva at 0% interest, and its three co-founders all went without salaries and volunteered their time.

SEM struggled with the sustainability of their model, as they were unwilling to raise interest rates to cover the cost of renting an office and hire loan officers and also unable to find outside donors.  Eventually Kurnia left in August 2009, and SEM began to struggle with delinquent loans, with its portfolio reaching a high of 77.4% delinquency in December, 2010. In response, SEM's team stopped making new loans and focused on collecting funds from their existing borrowers. Kurnia had donated $30k to subsidize SEM's operating costs, but once those donated funds and others ran out, the organization defaulted on 5.1% of its loans and Kiva closed its partnership with SEM in March 2012.

Kurnia's experience at SEM gave her visibility into the high operational costs of traditional microlenders.  By 2008, Internet access in developing nations had become widely available enough to make direct peer-to-peer microlending feasible. Kurnia founded Zidisha to connect lenders and borrowers directly, thereby reducing borrower costs.

Zidisha relaunched in January 2014 as one of the first seven non-profits funded by seed accelerator Y Combinator. In March 2014, Y Combinator partner Paul Buchheit donated $100k in a bid to further promote Zidisha online.

As of May 2015, Zidisha has financed $3.4 million in loans to 12,225 borrowers. Zidisha Inc results are distinguished from Zidisha Community. The non-profit is not a lender; it carries no loans on its books.

Lending process 

Zidisha's lending process works as follows:

Borrowing

1. A first-time loan applicant creates a profile that describes his or her business and personal details.  The applicant's details are independently checked by Zidisha or a Zidisha partner, such as a local credit bureau.    If the loan is approved and successfully funded, first-time borrowers are charged roughly $12 (1000 Kenyan Shillings) to cover this cost of processing their application. Upon joining Zidisha, borrowers also make a deposit into a reserve fund that is used to compensate lenders in the event of default.  These costs are only paid once and entitle the borrower to raise an unlimited number of consecutive loans through Zidisha. Zidisha used to contract with local partners to perform telephone-based verifications of each new borrower, but  the organization discontinued this practice due to fraud, corruption and ineffectiveness.

2. Approved applicants post a loan request that describes their life story, the proposed investment, desired loan amount and repayment period.  Zidisha's lender participants then have the opportunity to finance all or a portion of the loan at zero interest.

3. If enough lenders commit to lending the designated loan amount before the loan expires, the loan is funded and disbursed to the borrower; otherwise, it's expired, lenders are refunded and the borrower may try again with a new application.

4. For successfully funded loans, 100% of lenders' accepted bids are disbursed to the borrower. Loan values are fixed in local currency, using the exchange rate effective at the time the loan is disbursed.  Because loan values are fixed in local currency, lenders bear the risk of any currency exchange rate fluctuations.

Repayments

1. The borrower is obligated to repay principal and interest according to the schedule proposed in the loan application (usually in weekly installments). Each time the borrower makes a repayment installment, lenders' shares of principal repayment are credited to their accounts on the Zidisha website.

2. Zidisha borrowers are allowed to adjust their weekly installment amount upward or downward an unlimited number of times, as long as a single payment has been made since the last adjustment. Prior to November 11, 2013, borrowers had been allowed to ask for a grace period of 1–2 months on a loan, "during which time no payments would be due, but after which monthly installments would resume in the same amounts as before." After November 11, 2013, borrowers were no longer allowed to add a grace period, but continued to be allowed to raise or lower the amount of money due each week.

3. Throughout the loan application and repayment period, lenders may post comments and questions, and borrowers may supply additional information and business updates through a weblog on their profile pages.

4.  Loans made after March 2015 are covered by a reserve fund.  If one of these loans falls behind on payments by 10 days or more, lenders may opt to receive a full reimbursement of the amount they lent from the reserve fund.

5. Lenders may post feedback on all lending transactions with which they are involved, thus creating a performance record that allows borrowers to request progressively larger loans with each successful repayment.

Business Operations

To maintain a low interest rate, Zidisha operations are mostly supported by volunteer teams. The volunteers are either interns, who commit 10 hours/week, or volunteers, who commit 2 hours/week. Most interns and volunteers are typically organized by country, and are assigned a variety of day-to-day tasks. The tasks vary from email correspondence to borrowers and lenders, to disbursing loans, to translation and reviewing member user profiles. Zidisha has had much success with this operations model as many interns and volunteers have proven to reliably carry out Zidisha's day-to-day activities. Those interested to learn about micro-finance operations could check out Zidisha's website for volunteering opportunities.

Regulatory Status

Typically, peer-to-peer microlenders offering interest on loans to US lenders are regulated by the  Securities and Exchange Commission (SEC).  In 2008, the SEC required that peer-to-peer lending companies offering interest on loans to register their offerings as securities, pursuant to the Securities Act of 1933. Accordingly, Prosper was shut down by the SEC on November 24, 2008, and did not reopen until July 2009, after it had registered with the SEC. Lending Club announced its completion of the SEC registration process on October 14, 2008. MYC4, a microlending marketplace focused on African entrepreneurs, similarly announced in 2010 that they are "not allowed to disburse money to North American Investors" because of SEC regulations.

Zidisha has not registered with the SEC, and has publicly stated that they are not a securities broker. The website states in its terms of use that unlike a securities broker, Zidisha is under no obligation to return lender funds and honor withdrawal requests: "Zidisha makes no guarantee or representation that funds lent through its website will be repaid to lenders, regardless of whether the loans financed with lender funds are repaid to Zidisha. Any cash payouts are promotional gifts offered solely at Zidisha's discretion."

The tax treatment of these promotional gifts is unclear.  Gifts are taxed in the United States, which would mean that for US lenders, the original loan principal, if withdrawn, would be subject to taxation.  Zidisha states in its terms that, "It is the responsibility of website users to report and pay any applicable taxes on any cash payouts received from Zidisha."

Interest rates

Starting in February 2015, Zidisha borrowers no longer pay interest.  Instead, they make a one-time deposit into a reserve fund upon joining Zidisha, and thereafter pay a service fee of 5% of each loan raised.  The reserve fund is used to compensate lenders in the event a loan is not repaid on time.  The service fee goes to Zidisha to cover money transfer costs.

This is much lower than the global average of interest rate of 35% for microfinance loans. According to an analysis published by microfinance risk consultant Daniel Rozas in July 2011, Zidisha offers loans at less than half the interest rates of traditional microfinance institutions as estimated by MFTransparency.

The inflation rate in developing nations varies widely, and can be as high as 53%, much higher than the interest rates usually paid to microlenders. Zidisha does not provide protection from losses due to currency risk, but also does not restrict lenders' ability to profit from currency fluctuations.

Performance

2009-2014 

As of June 2014, Zidisha's lenders had raised $2,106,294 for 6,879 individual loans at an average lender interest rate of 5.1% since the organization was founded in 2009.

The status of the $2,106,294 as of June 2014 was as follows:

$1,082,861 (51.4% of amount disbursed) had been repaid to lenders.

$454,189 (21.6% of amount disbursed) was still outstanding with borrowers who are repaying on time (within a threshold of 30 days and $10).

$184,530 (8.8% of amount disbursed) was still outstanding with borrowers who are more than 30 days and $10 late with scheduled repayments.

$15,063 (0.7% of amount disbursed) had been forgiven by the lenders for humanitarian reasons.

$369,748 (17.6% of amount disbursed) had been written off by Zidisha.

Performance by country

Zidisha's performance has varied by country.  For loans disbursed within the year between June 2013 and June 2014, 81.1% of loans in Kenya had been repaid or were being repaid on time, 93% of loans in Burkina Faso had been repaid or were being repaid on time, 92.8% of loans in Niger had been repaid or were being repaid on time, and 92.9% of loans in Indonesia had been repaid or were being repaid on time.

June 2014 to May 2015 

In the year from June 2014 to May 2015, Zidisha lenders raised $1,313,316 for 7,693 individual loans at an average lender interest rate of 3.8% (note: Zidisha discontinued interest in February 2015).

The status of the $1,313,316 as of May 2015 was as follows:

$555,190 (42.3% of amount disbursed) had been repaid to lenders.

$521,405 (39.7% of amount disbursed) was still outstanding with borrowers who are repaying on time (within a threshold of 30 days and $10).

$92,437 (7.0% of amount disbursed) was still outstanding with borrowers who are more than 30 days and $10 late with scheduled repayments.

$37 (0.1% of amount disbursed) had been forgiven by the lenders for humanitarian reasons.

$46,885 (3.6% of amount disbursed) had been written off by Zidisha.

Changes in reporting methodology 

Zidisha had previously reported a repayment rate of 98% as of August 2012, but this repayment rate counted only those loans whose final repayment dates had occurred 6+ months ago.  Zidisha stated that "incorporating such a long time lag made the statistics less useful, and so we modified the calculations to include all loans whose final repayment dates have already arrived, even though they have not yet had time to be written off."

The revised repayment rate (not incorporating the time lag) was 89.3% as of August 2013.  Zidisha subsequently made its write-off policy stricter, classifying a loan as written off if it is not repaid six months after its due date, or if the borrower has not made any payments for six months.  This stricter writeoff policy resulted in a reported writeoff rate of 17.6% of ended loans as of June 29, 2014.

Zidisha defines its repayment and writeoff statistics more conservatively than other microlending websites. For example, Kiva, the world's largest microlending website, reports any loans not yet written off as repaid, even if they are still outstanding with the borrower.  Kiva also counts repayments made by field partners to cover borrower defaults as part of its on-time repayment rate.

Some observers argued that Zidisha's writeoff policy is too strict, as it has often resulted in loans that are still actively repaying (but over six months late) as being written off.  Zidisha's stated rationale to maintaining such a strict writeoff policy is that they wish to err on the side of reporting high write-off rates to prospective lenders so that they fully understand the risks of lending with Zidisha, and Zidisha continues to follow up with written off loans and return the repayments collected to lenders.

Recognition

Zidisha has been a finalist and semifinalist for the Echoing Green foundation for early-stage social enterprises, and was an Ashoka Fellow nominee.

In 2014 Zidisha became one of the first seven nonprofits to graduate from seed accelerator Y Combinator.

See also 

 Microcredit
 Peer-to-peer lending
 Social entrepreneurship

References

External links 
 

Microfinance organizations
Non-profit organizations based in Sterling, Virginia
Peer-to-peer charities
Peer-to-peer lending companies
Development charities based in the United States
International development in Africa
Organizations established in 2009
Charities based in Virginia
501(c)(3) organizations
Online nonprofit organizations
Ashoka USA Fellows